The Design 1065 ship (full name Emergency Fleet Corporation Design 1065) was a wooden-hulled cargo ship design approved for production by the United States Shipping Boards Emergency Fleet Corporation (EFT) in World War I. A total of 7 ships were ordered and completed for the USSB from 1918 to 1919. The ships were constructed at the Bellingham, Washington shipyard of Pacific American Fisheries. The USSB originally wanted Pacific American Fisheries to follow its standard "Ferris-type" design (Design 1001) used by other shipyards but PAF was successful in convincing them to use their own design which they felt was more seaworthy. The cost was $50,000 per ship.

References

Bibliography

External links
 EFC Design 1065: Illustrations

Standard ship types of the United States